The Laminin database is a database of non-collagenous extracellular matrix proteins.

See also
 Laminin

References

External links
 http://www.lm.lncc.br

Biological databases
Laminins